
AD 15 (XV) was a common year starting on Tuesday (link will display the full calendar) of the Julian calendar. At the time, it was known as the Year of the Consulship of Caesar and Flaccus (or, less frequently, year 768 Ab urbe condita). The denomination AD 15 for this year has been used since the early medieval period, when the Anno Domini calendar era became the prevalent method in Europe for naming years.

Events

By place

Roman Empire 
 Early (approx.) – Emona (on the site of modern-day Ljubljana) is founded by Legio XV Apollinaris.
 May – As part of his campaign against the Germanic peoples, Germanicus captures Thusnelda, wife of Arminius.
 Summer – Germanicus launches a two-pronged  attack from Vetera and Moguntiacum. On his return journey, he recaptures the aquila of Legio XIX and visits the battlefield of the Teutoburg Forest. Germanicus arranges the burial for the remains of Varus' army.   
 Varna (Odessus), on the Bulgarian Black Sea Coast, is annexed to the Roman province of Moesia.
 In Rome, the election of magistrates passes from the people to the Emperor and the Senate.
 The river Tiber floods parts of Rome.

By topic

Arts and sciences 
 Nicolaus of Damascus writes a biography of the Emperor Augustus (Bios Kaisaros).

Births 
 September 24 – Vitellius, Roman emperor (d. AD 69)
 November 6 – Agrippina the Younger, Roman empress (d. AD 59)
 Apollonius of Tyana, Greek philosopher (d. c. AD 97)
 Ennia Thrasylla, Roman noblewoman (d. AD 38)
 Lollia Paulina, Roman empress (d. AD 49)
 Lucius Verginius Rufus, Roman consul (d. AD 97)

Deaths 
 Lucius Seius Strabo, Roman praetorian prefect (b. 46 BC)

References 

 

als:10er#15